Pitchoff Mountain is a  mountain opposite Cascade Mountain on NY 73 west of Keene Valley in Essex County, New York, in the US. There are two summits; the higher summit is viewless, but the northern summit, at  offers 360 degree views of the nearby Cascade Lakes, the High Peaks of the Adirondacks, and, in clear weather, the Green Mountains of Vermont.

See also
 List of mountains in New York

References

External links
 SummitPost.org - Pitchoff
 PeakBagger.com - Pitchoff

Mountains of Essex County, New York
Tourist attractions in Essex County, New York
Mountains of New York (state)